Gerald's Party is the fourth novel written by Robert Coover, published in 1986. The book encompasses a single night at a party given by the title character and narrator, Gerald. Though the murder of a beautiful actress is central to the plot, Coover's text has little in common with a traditional murder mystery. He appears to be approaching the murder mystery genre with the goal of subverting/exhausting its possibilities. A comparable strategy can be seen in his retellings of fairy tales (see Briar Rose, A Child Again), and his reframing of movie conventions (Ghost Town, A Night at the Movies). Like most of Coover's works, this is experimental fiction. The text regularly returns to themes of sex, violence, and a blurred boundary between theatre and reality.

Plot introduction
As Gerald tries to describe the things around him in painstaking detail, he recounts simultaneous conversations and events as they happen by using a format similar to data packet handling. After describing a small part of a situation or a conversation, he moves on to a small part of a different conversation, then returns to the first conversation, or maybe moves on to a third or a  fourth, returning each time to try to be as accurate as possible while recording the events.

Major themes
The tone of the novel is humorous, and there are many puns, double-entendres, jokes, sight-gags, and deliberate ironies. There are also graphic depictions of various bodily functions, including different types of sexual intercourse. Gerald, speaking in what could be described as stream-of-consciousness, often appears unaffected by the decadent and orgiastic events that surround him, and, in addition, he comes across as an unreliable narrator.

References 

1986 American novels
American crime novels
Fiction with unreliable narrators
Novels set in one day